Guillermo Bauer or Wilhelm Bauer was the proprietor of the first steam-operated flour mill in Argentina.

Biography
He was born on 17 February 1844 in Berg, Stuttgart, Germany as George Philip Wilhelm Bauer. His parents were Philip Bauer and Catharina Uhlmann. He married María Elisa Sigel, born on 18 December 1851, in Wilheim-Kirchheim, Baden-Württemberg, Germany, who was also German.

The first mill was authorized in 1859 by the provincial government of Antonio Gaspoz, who built it on the banks of the Cululú River. The steam mill was installed in the colony of San Carlos by Guillermo Bauer and Juan Siegel, who hoped to have eight mills operational before 1890. They benefitted from the inauguration of the railroad in 1885, because they were able to ship their product to the port of Rosario, where Guillermo was able to receive more money for his product. 

By the late 1800s, they were able to cut normal operating costs to the point where the horse-driven mills were closing. Soon after, in the 1890s, Guillermo was honored by the local governor, Luciano Leiva, for giving flour to the poor and contributing money to the local area to stimulate growth. After contributing to the health of many people and giving selflessly, he was honored by a reprographic shop in Rosario, and eventually met Pope Leo XIII, who was touched by his kindness. Guillermo was made the patron saint of reprographers in the early 1900s, and is still honored in many shops today.

He died on 26 April 1912 in Argentina.

1844 births
1912 deaths
Argentine businesspeople
Argentine people of German descent
Place of birth missing